The Jan van Eyckplein is a square in Bruges, West Flanders, Belgium. The square is named for noted Northern Renaissance painter Jan van Eyck. It is located at the intersection of the Academiestraat, the Spiegelrei and the Spanjaardstraat.

References

Squares in Belgium
Tourist attractions in Bruges
Culture in Bruges
Jan van Eyck